Lee Soon-jae (born November 16, 1934) is a South Korean actor. He has had a prolific career on the small and big screen spanning over six decades, and was given a second-class Eungwan Order of Cultural Merit for his work as an actor.

Early and personal life
Lee was born in Hoeryong, North Hamgyong Province, now part of North Korea. When he was four years old, his family moved to Seoul where Lee's grandparents were living. Lee's grandfather ran a small real estate business, while his father produced and sold soaps. Lee was raised in the neighborhood of Ahyeon-dong, and graduated from Seoul High School and the prestigious Seoul National University. He also holds an insurance planning license as celebrities without the license cannot become endorsers or spokespeople of related products.

Lee first met his wife Choi Hee-jung as a university student as she was the sister of his fellow student theater troupe member. They married in 1966 and have two children.

Career
Lee Soon-jae made his debut in 1956 with play 'Beyond the Horizon' when he was a senior at the Department of Philosophy at Seoul National University. In the 1950s and 1960s he was known, along with other veteran actors like Yeo Woon-kay, as the original stars of daehakgeuk or amateur student theatrical productions. Lee has since built a prolific career on the small and big screen spanning nearly six decades. He was most active in film in the late 1960s through the 1970s, most notably in Yu Hyun-mok's Bun-Rye's Story. As he grew older, Lee shifted to a primarily TV career in the 1990s, receiving acclaim for his roles in the television dramas Live As I Please (written by Yoo Ho), Pungwoon (Crisis), What is Love (written by Kim Soo-hyun) and Hur Jun.

From 1992 to 1996, Lee served as a member of the 14th National Assembly of South Korea. He quit politics after one term after finding the political climate "too barren" for his taste. Lee remains active in his various advocacies, such as the Korea Broadcasting Actors Union.

He is also a professor of Film Arts at Sejong University, a professor emeritus of Performing Arts at Gachon University, and the director of the SG Academy. After starring in Hur Jun, he was given an honorary doctorate in Oriental Medicine by Kyung Hee University.

In 2018, Lee was awarded a second-class Eungwan Order of Cultural Merit by the Korean government, for his work as an actor.

Recent works

High Kick!
In 2007, Lee, by then a distinguished veteran actor, reached new heights of mainstream popularity when he starred in the sitcom Unstoppable High Kick!. One particular scene became a huge hit among young audiences: when his stern grandfather character discovers porn while browsing through a family member's computer files, then embarrassingly gets caught watching. It went viral, giving rise to numerous parodies in which "Yadong (Porn) Soon-jae" is involved in R-rated hijinks. Lee was surprised that even his granddaughter asked for his autograph for her friends, adding, "Even during my best years, my daughter never asked me for that." Despite having no superstars in the cast, the sitcom received high ratings, which Lee attributed to successfully building comic tension. He said, "For an actor to be funny, he's got to play things straight. [...] It's about finding the comedy in something serious." But Lee also lamented the recent trend of casting inexperienced actors in leading roles on TV, saying, "It's important to know the basics, like the language. How can you act, when you don't even know how to pronounce? Acting is not a simple thing, and this I can say from experience." He later returned as the family patriarch in High Kick Through the Roof, which shares the same concept as the previous sitcom, but with a different cast and characters.

Good Morning President
In 2009, Lee made his big screen comeback after 20 years in television, in Jang Jin's comedy Good Morning President. The movie tells the story of three fictional Korean presidents, and in the first segment, Lee played a well-respected elderly president nearing the end of his term who espouses frugality and charity, but then agonizes whether to take the money when he unexpectedly wins the lottery. Lee said, "I was impressed with how much times have changed; before it would have been impossible to parody the president. The film tries to show that heads of state are only human, just like you and me, which I think makes the movie distinctive, as well as fresh and fun for viewers."

Late Blossom
In 2011, Lee, Yoon So-jung, Song Jae-ho and Kim Soo-mi starred in Late Blossom, a tearjerker romance about two elderly couples, based on the popular webtoon I Love You by Kang Full. Lee said the movie was a rare chance for him and other senior actors to play leading roles on the big screen. He added that Korea's senior citizen population had surpassed five million, and "not understanding their feelings would be a failure of television dramas, movies and even elections. Young people might be under the illusion that life is over after turning 60, but the heart doesn't change despite getting old." Initially difficult to finance due to ageism, Late Blossom had a small shooting and marketing budget compared to most Korean mainstream films. But it became a sleeper hit, recouping four times its cost in just a few weeks. Lee also won Best Actor under the international film category at the China Golden Rooster and Hundred Flowers Film Festival, becoming its oldest recipient. Lee said, "I never thought I'd win. What a surprise. It feels great to know that Late Blossom has been received well overseas. I thought it would be hard for an actor from television dramas to be awarded a prize at film awards, not to mention the unexpected pleasure of winning at a foreign film festival. I have received the best entertainer award and achievement award before, but receiving this makes me happier and more thrilled." It was his first best actor award for a film in 34 years since the 1977 Baeksang Arts Awards.

Theater
Lee returned to the stage in 2012 in Father, a Korean adaptation of Arthur Miller's play Death of a Salesman. This was his third time to play the character Willy Loman. Lee said, "When I first played this role in 1978, some parts were rather incomprehensible. But now, as our society developed, we can finally fully understand what those lines mean. That is the beauty of working on masterpieces like Arthur Miller's. I feel a satisfaction and regret at the same time, for I have reached a new comprehension, and for the perspective that I have yet to discover." He reprised the role in 2013, under the direction of Kim Myung-gon.

Grandpas Over Flowers
In 2013, cable channel tvN launched the travel-reality show Grandpas Over Flowers (the title parodies the manga Boys Over Flowers). It marked producer Na Young-seok's first variety show since leaving KBS, where he was best known for creating the first season of hit variety show 2 Days & 1 Night. Defying a youth-centered entertainment industry, the hit show stars four veteran actors in their 70s, Shin Goo, Park Geun-hyung and Baek Il-seob, with their porter Lee Seo-jin as they go on a backpacking tour of France, Taiwan and Spain.

The first season aired from July 5 to August 16, 2013 with seven episodes. It was filmed in Paris, Strasbourg, Bern, and Lucerne. It was immediately followed by the airing of the second season from August 23 to September 20, 2013. The five episodes were filmed in Taiwan, with an additional two-episode special featuring unaired footage on September 27 and October 4, 2013. The third season aired from March 7 to May 2, 2014 with eight episodes. It was filmed in Spain, specifically the cities of Barcelona, Granada, Seville, Ronda, and Madrid. Shin Goo also went on a solo trip to Lisbon. The fourth season aired from March 27 to May 8, 2015 with seven episodes. It was filmed in Dubaiand Greece, with Choi Ji-woo joining as a second travel guide and assistant.

After a few years' break, a fifth season titled Grandpa Over Flowers Returns aired from June 29 to August 24, 2018 with nine episodes. Actor Kim Yong-gun joined the cast for the trip filmed in Germany, Czech Republic and Austria.

Idol School
In 2017, he joined Idol School as principal and narrator. Idol School is a survival program, making a new permanent girl group in 11 weeks. They are trained in dance, vocal, and physical education while gathering votes from public and performing on stages.

As of 2019, he is the oldest active actor and the oldest actor. Song Hae-ga (Donggap, Im Kwon-taek) is the only senior artist among all celebrities. It was the first to be dedicated to the Korean Broadcasting Hall of Fame and earlier to the MBC Hall of Fame.

Filmography

Television series

Film

Variety show

Theater

Awards

State honors

Listicles

Notes

References

External links 
 
 
 

South Korean male television actors
South Korean male film actors
South Korean male stage actors
Academic staff of Sejong University
Seoul National University alumni
Seoul High School alumni
1935 births
Living people
21st-century South Korean male actors
20th-century South Korean male actors
Academic staff of Gachon University
Best Actor Paeksang Arts Award (theatre) winners